Fasli is an abandoned Turkish Cypriot village in the Paphos District of Cyprus, located 2 km south of Androlikou.

Naming 
Fasli is a village located near the Akamas peninsula, nine kilometers southwest of Polis and four kilometers northwest of Dhrousha. It is believed by many that the name Phasli or Fasli derives from fasla, meaning “plot of land.” The villagers of Androlikou and Fasli believe that after a land dispute in Androlikou, the agha of the village told one of the opponents that he was willing to give him one fasla if he agreed to move where the current village is situated. He apparently accepted the offer, and the village was founded and called Fasla. The Turkish Cypriots eventually slightly changed the name from Fasla to Faslı. The Ottoman word "fasla", on the other hand, may be translated as "a date-palm sucker planted out".

Altitude 
Fasli is located 515 m above sea level. 

It receives 610 mm of rainfall annually.

Misspelling 
Fasli is often misspelled as Phasli.

References

Communities in Paphos District

pl:Fas